Ibrahim Allam is a paralympic athlete from Egypt competing mainly in category F58 shot put events.

Ibrahim is a two time Paralympic gold medalist, winning the F58 shot put in both the 2000 and 2004 Summer Paralympics.

References

Paralympic athletes of Egypt
Athletes (track and field) at the 2000 Summer Paralympics
Athletes (track and field) at the 2004 Summer Paralympics
Paralympic gold medalists for Egypt
Living people
Medalists at the 2000 Summer Paralympics
Medalists at the 2004 Summer Paralympics
Year of birth missing (living people)
Paralympic medalists in athletics (track and field)
Egyptian male shot putters
Wheelchair shot putters
Paralympic shot putters